This is a list of the first women lawyer(s) and judge(s) in Nebraska. It includes the year in which the women were admitted to practice law (in parentheses). Also included are women who achieved other distinctions such becoming the first in their state to graduate from law school or become a political figure.

Firsts in state history

Lawyers 

First female: Ada Bittenbender (1882)  
First African American female: Zanzye H.A. Hill (1929)

State judges 

 First (African American) female: Elizabeth Davis Pittman (1949) in 1971 
 First female (county court): Mary Gilbride in 1992 
 First female (district court): Mary Gilbride in 1998 
 First female (Nebraska Supreme Court): Lindsey Miller-Lerman in 1998  
 First Latino American female: Stefanie Martinez in 2013  
 First Native American (female) (district court): Andrea Miller in 2018 
 First African American female (district court): Tressa Alioth in 2021 
 First Native American (female) to sit on a Nebraska Supreme Court case: Andrea Miller in 2022

United States Attorney 

 First female: Deborah Gilg in 2009

County Attorney 

 First female: Grace Ballard (1914) during the 1920s

Nebraska Bar Association 

 First female president: Amy Longo (1979) in 1999

Firsts in local history
 Mary Gilbride: First female to serve as a county judge (1992) and district court judge (1998) in the Fifth Judicial District, Nebraska [Boone, Butler, Colfax, Hamilton, Merrick, Nance, Platte, Polk, Saunders, Seward and York Counties, Nebraska]
 Stefanie Martinez: First Latino American female to serve as a Judge of the County Court, Second Judicial District in Nebraska (2013) [Cass, Otoe, and Sarpy Counties, Nebraska]
 Karen Ditsch (1992): First female elected County Attorney in Box Butte County, Nebraska (1999-2004)
 Frances O’Linn (1891): First female lawyer in Dawes County, Nebraska
 Elizabeth Davis Pittman (1949): First African American female to graduate from the Creighton School of Law in Omaha, Nebraska (1971). She was also the first female (and African American female) appointed to deputy on the staff of the Douglas County Attorney's Office (1964). [Douglas County, Nebraska]
 Zanzye H.A. Hill (1929): First African American female law graduate from the University of Nebraska-Lincoln (1929) [Lancaster County, Nebraska]
Janice Gradwohl: First female judge in Lancaster County, Nebraska (1974)
Grace Ballard (1914): First female to serve as the County Attorney for Washington County, Nebraska (c. 1920s)

See also  

 List of first women lawyers and judges in the United States
 Timeline of women lawyers in the United States
 Women in law

Other topics of interest 

 List of first minority male lawyers and judges in the United States
 List of first minority male lawyers and judges in Nebraska

References 

Lawyers, Nebraska, first
Nebraska, first
Women, Nebraska, first
Women, Nebraska, first
Women in Nebraska
Lists of people from Nebraska
Nebraska lawyers